Moj rođak sa sela is a TV series program written by Radoslav Pavlović and co-produced by Radio Television of Serbia and Košutnjak Film. Two seasons, with a total of 28 episodes have been produced by now. The first episode aired in 2008 and the last in 2011.

Most of the plot takes place in a village in Šumadija, central Serbia. The series follow two parallel stories, a story of Malešević family, and a story of their cousin, a spy, Vranić. The plot contains a lot of humour and draws an image of a political reality of modern Serbia.

The series were very well received with the audience, and attracted record audience reaching more than 3 million viewers per episode. It is one of the most successful TV series produced by Radio Television of Serbia in the past decade.

References

Radio Television of Serbia original programming
Serbian-language television shows
Serbian comedy television series
2008 Serbian television series debuts
2011 Serbian television series endings
Television shows set in Serbia
Television shows filmed in Serbia